The 2008–09 PFC Levski Sofia season included the club's 26th win of the A group of Bulgarian professional football, A Group. Additionally they competed in the Semi-finals of the 2008–09 Bulgarian Cup, but lost to OFC Pirin Blagoevgrad. The club made it to the third round of the UEFA Champions League. The top goal scorer was Georgi Ivanov with 13 total goals. The club changed managers from Velislav Vutsov to Emil Velev on the 13th of August 2008.

Transfers

Summer transfers

In: 

Out:

See List of Bulgarian football transfers 2008–09

Winter transfers

In: 

Out:

See List of Bulgarian football transfers 2008–09

Squad

Competitions

A Group

Table

Results summary

Results by round

Fixtures and results

Bulgarian Cup

Second round

Third round

Quarterfinals

Semifinals

UEFA Champions League

Third qualifying round

UEFA Cup

First round

External links
 2008–09 Levski Sofia season

PFC Levski Sofia seasons
Levski Sofia
Bulgarian football championship-winning seasons